Dean Wells may refer to:

 Dean Wells (American football) (born 1970), American football player
 Dean Wells (English footballer) (born 1985), English footballer
 Dean Wells (politician) (born 1949), Australian politician
 Dean Faulkner Wells (1936–2011), American author, editor and publisher

See also
Dean of Wells